The Grafton Wanderers were a Pennsylvania–West Virginia League baseball team based in Grafton, West Virginia that played in 1908 and 1909. To begin the 1908 season, they were known as the Scottdale Millers, based in Scottdale, Pennsylvania. In 1910, an un-nicknamed Grafton team based in Grafton played in the West Virginia League. The Wanderers were Grafton's first professional baseball team ever. The 1910 squad was its last to date.

Notable players include Bert James, Buck Washer, Del Gainer, John Hinton, Bobby Rothermel and Guy Zinn.

References

Baseball teams established in 1908
Defunct minor league baseball teams
Pennsylvania-West Virginia League teams
West Virginia League teams
Professional baseball teams in West Virginia
1908 establishments in West Virginia
1910 disestablishments in West Virginia
Baseball teams disestablished in 1910
Taylor County, West Virginia
Defunct baseball teams in West Virginia